The Ketil (meaning "Shell Mountain") is a 2,010 m–high mountain in southern Greenland, in the Kujalleq municipality.

Ketil's granite walls are similar to Tiningnertok's (Apostelen Tommelfinger), another massive peak in the east coast.

Geography
Together with Nalumasortoq and Ulamertorsuaq, Ketil is part of the group of three massive largely unglaciated rocky mountains rising in the peninsula of the mainland which forms the eastern side of the Tasermiut Fjord. 

In the same manner as its slightly lower neighbour Ulamertorsuaq, Ketil has become popular among mountain climbers owing to its higher than 1000 m sheer western granite wall. It is considered one of the most challenging Big Walls on Earth.

This mountain is marked as a  peak in some sources.

See also
Big wall climbing
List of mountains in Greenland

Bibliography
Greenland Tourism: Hiking Map South Greenland/Tasermiut fjorden – Nanortalik. 1996

References

External links
The Summer 1998 Slovak Expedition to Greenland (Jamesák International)
Greenland Chapter 1: How an idea turned into 'big wall' reality
Mountains of Greenland